Tracy MacCharles (born ) is a former politician in Ontario, Canada. She was a Liberal member of the Legislative Assembly of Ontario from 2011 to 2018 who represented the riding of Pickering—Scarborough East. She was a member of cabinet in the government of Kathleen Wynne.

Background
MacCharles was born and raised in Scarborough, Ontario. She went to Brock University where she obtained a degree in Business and Public Administration. She worked in human resources management in various roles including Vice President of Human Resources at Manulife Financial. She was chair of the Ontario Accessibility Standards Advisory Council and was a member of the Durham Board of Education’s Special Education Advisory Committee.

She lives in Pickering with her husband Stephen Little and their two children.

Politics
MacCharles ran in the 2011 provincial election as the Liberal candidate in the riding of Pickering—Scarborough East. She defeated Progressive Conservative candidate Kevin Gaudet by 5,168 votes. She was easily re-elected in the 2014 election defeating Gaudet again, this time by 10,505 votes.

On November 10, 2011, MacCharles was appointed as Parliamentary Assistant to the Minister of Children and Youth Services. On February 11, 2013 she was sworn in as Minister of Consumer Services under new Premier Kathleen Wynne. On June 24, 2014 she was appointed Minister of Children and Youth Services as well as Minister responsible for Women's Issues.

On April 5, 2016, MacCharles announced changes in the autism services program, which included opening up 16,000 new spaces with an investment of $333 million additional dollars to the program. However, the announced changes also included removing children with autism over the age of five from the IBI waitlist to the ABA waitlist, and giving the families an $8000 stipend for these children to receive treatment. The move was resisted by some parents and expert groups. The government revised the changes two months later and MacCharles was demoted to the role of Minister without portfolio, responsible for accessibility and women's issues in Ontario.

On January 12, 2017, she was promoted to the position of Minister of Government and Consumer Services, a move precipitated by the resignation of David Orazietti in December 2016.

MacCharles announced her retirement from provincial politics in April 2018, a few months before the next Ontario election.

Cabinet positions

Election results

References

Notes

Citations

External links

1963 births
21st-century Canadian politicians
21st-century Canadian women politicians
Brock University alumni
Living people
Members of the Executive Council of Ontario
Ontario Liberal Party MPPs
People from Pickering, Ontario
People from Scarborough, Toronto
Politicians from Toronto
Women government ministers of Canada
Women MPPs in Ontario